Robert Aldrich or Aldridge (died March 1555) was Bishop of Carlisle in the reigns of Henry VIII, Edward VI and Mary.

Richard Aldrich was born at Burnham, Buckinghamshire, and educated at Eton and Cambridge.

In 1534 he was appointed Canon of the tenth stall at St George's Chapel, Windsor Castle, a position he held until 1537.

He was consecrated bishop of Carlisle on 18 July 1537. He became in 1534 register of the order of the Garter, in the room of Dr. Richard Sydnor, archdeacon of Totnes. He was praised by Erasmus, while he was a fellow of King's College, as a young man of eloquence; and Leland, the antiquary, who was his friend, has celebrated him in a copy of Latin verses. He was both master and provost of Eton; but in 1529 he retired to Oxford and was incorporated B.D. and afterwards proceeded D.D. in that university. He died in 1555 at Horncastle in Lincolnshire.

Works
His principal works are the following.

Epistola ad Gwielmum Hormannum
Epigrammata varia
Several Resolutions concerning the Sacraments
Answers to certain Queries concerning the Abuses of the Mass

Sources

External links

 

1555 deaths
People from Burnham, Buckinghamshire
People educated at Eton College
Bishops of Carlisle
Alumni of King's College, Cambridge
16th-century English bishops
People of the Tudor period
English male writers
16th-century English writers
16th-century male writers
Year of birth unknown
Canons of Windsor